Shahriyar (also spelled Shahryar) was a Sasanian prince—he was the son of Khosrow II (r. 590-628) and his Christian queen Shirin. In 628, a son of Khosrow II, Kavadh II, staged a coup d'état against his father, and thereafter had all his brothers and half-brothers executed. Shahriyar was survived by his son Yazdegerd III, who would later rule the Sasanian Empire from 632 to 651.

Sources 

7th-century Iranian people
628 deaths
Year of birth unknown
Sasanian princes
People executed by the Sasanian Empire
Children of Khosrow II
Executed royalty